The Santa Fe Trail is a 1930 American pre-Code Western film, directed by Otto Brower and Edwin H. Knopf, released by Paramount Pictures, and starring Richard Arlen, Rosita Moreno, and Eugene Pallette. The film was an adaptation of Hal George Evarts's 1925 novel, Spanish Acres.

Synopsis
A sheepherder (Arlen) has to clear his name after being erroneously accused of murdering and Indian. Two children who saw the killing come to his aid.

Cast

 Richard Arlen as Stan Hollister
 Rosita Moreno as Maria Castinado
 Eugene Pallette as Doc Brady
 Mitzi Green as Emily
 Junior Durkin as Old Timer
 Hooper Atchley as Marc Coulard
 Luis Alberni as Juan Castinado
 Lee Shumway as Slaven
 Chief Standing Bear as Chief Sutanek
 Blue Cloud as Eagle Feather
 Chief Yowlachie as Brown Beaver
 Jack Byron as Webber

Production
In addition to Brower and Knopf as directors, Sam Mintz and Edward E. Paramore Jr. were writers. David Abel was director of photography, Verna Willis was film editor, and Earl Hayman was recording engineer.

References

External links
 The Santa Fe Trail at IMDB
 
 
 

1930 films
American Western (genre) films
1930 Western (genre) films
Films directed by Otto Brower
American black-and-white films
Santa Fe Trail
Films based on American novels
Paramount Pictures films
1930s English-language films
1930s American films